Vrishaketu  is  a figure in the  Hindu Sanskrit epic Mahabharata. He was the son of Karna and  Vrushali and also the youngest of Karna's sons. He was the only surviving son of Karna as he didn't participate because of his young age. After Arjuna got to know that Karna was his elder brother, he trained Vrishaketu. Later he was made the king of Anga.

Legends 
Vrishaketu was the youngest son of Karna. He is the only son of karna to survive the Mahabharat war. Once Karna's identity was revealed, he was taken under the patronage of the Pandavas. He was the last mortal who had the knowledge of Divyastras like Brahmastra and Varunastra. It is said that all the Pandavas especially Arjuna had great affection towards him. So Arjun taught him all the skills of archery. Krishna asked Vrishaketu for something; Vrishaketu told him he will give him whatever he asks for; and Krishna asked him to not teach anybody the knowledge of divine and celestial weapons.

Of the 9 sons of Karna, only the youngest son Vrishaketu survived the Mahabharata war. After the war when Pandavas became aware of Karna's lineage, Pandavas gave Vrishaketu kingdom of Anga and he remained under the patronage of Arjuna. Before Ashwamedha Yagna, he took part in Arjuna's several war against other kings. Vrishaketu was an active participant in Yudhishthira's Ashvamedha yagna. During the campaign, he married the daughter of King Yavanata. Later in the conquest both Vrishaketu and Arjuna were killed by Babruvahana, Arjun was revived by Krishna using a Nagmani. and Vrishaketu was revived by Krishna and was made the king of Anga.

References

Bibliography 
 Laura Gibbs, PhD. Modern Languages MLLL-4993. Indian Epics.
 Dowson's Classical Dictionary of Hindu Mythology

External Links
Glossary of Terms in Indian Scriptures: S
Vrishaketu in Encyclopedia for Epics of Ancient India

Characters in the Mahabharata